Sean Thomas White (born  April 25, 1981) is an American former Major League Baseball (MLB) right-handed relief pitcher who played for the Seattle Mariners between 2007 and 2010.

Amateur career
A native of Pullman, Washington, White attended Mercer Island High School in Mercer Island, Washington and the University of Washington. In 2001, he played collegiate summer baseball with the Orleans Cardinals of the Cape Cod Baseball League, and returned to the league in 2002 to play for the Brewster Whitecaps. White was selected by the Atlanta Braves in 8th Round (247th overall) of 2003 MLB Draft.

Professional career

Atlanta Braves
White was named the Danville Braves Pitcher of the Month for August, going 3–0 with a 0.67 ERA.

On two occasions he threw a season-high 7.0 innings of shutout ball. White finished the season 6–6 with a 3.60 ERA in 16 games.

In  he spent the season with the Single-A Myrtle Beach Pelicans and the Double-A Mississippi Braves. He finished fourth in the organization with 11 wins, ranked eighth with a 3.85 ERA and 10th with 98 strikeouts. He was 9–3 through 18 appearances with Myrtle Beach, including 4–0 at home until he made his Double-A debut on July 18, throwing 6.0 shutout innings in a 1–0. He was named Myrtle Beach's June Pitcher of the Month by the organization going 3–2 with a 3.63 ERA in 34.2 innings pitched.

He split the season with the Double-A Braves and the Gulf Coast Braves. He went a combined 5–6 with a 4.12 ERA.

Seattle Mariners
White made his Major League Debut on April 4,  against the Oakland Athletics. He was one of 6 players to make his Major League debut with Seattle in 2007, making 15 appearances, all in relief. He went 1–1 with a 5.60 ERA. White limited opposing batters to a .261 batting average.

Colorado Rockies
On January 11, 2011, White signed a minor league deal with the Colorado Rockies. He played for the Colorado Springs Sky Sox.

Boston Red Sox
On February 11, 2012, White signed a minor league contract with the Boston Red Sox but was released at the end of spring training.

Los Angeles Angels of Anaheim
On May 7, 2012, White signed a minor league contract with the Los Angeles Angels of Anaheim and appeared in 29 games with the AAA Salt Lake Bees.

Los Angeles Dodgers
On February 18, 2013, he signed a minor league contract with the Los Angeles Dodgers and was assigned to the AAA Albuquerque Isotopes. He appeared in 34 games (7 starts) and was 
6–6 with a 3.51 ERA.

References

External links

1981 births
Living people
Albuquerque Isotopes players
Arizona League Mariners players
Baseball players from Washington (state)
Brewster Whitecaps players
Cardenales de Lara players
American expatriate baseball players in Venezuela
Colorado Springs Sky Sox players
Danville Braves players
Everett AquaSox players
Gulf Coast Braves players
Major League Baseball pitchers
Mississippi Braves players
Myrtle Beach Pelicans players
Orleans Firebirds players
People from Pullman, Washington
Peoria Javelinas players
Rome Braves players
Salt Lake Bees players
Seattle Mariners players
Tacoma Rainiers players
Washington Huskies baseball players
Wisconsin Timber Rattlers players
Mercer Island High School alumni